The 1999 Australian GT Production Car Championship was an Australian motor racing competition open to cars complying with Group 3E Series Production Car regulations. It was the sanctioned by the Confederation of Australian Motor Sport as an Australian title and was the fourth Australian GT Production Car Championship.

The championship was won by Jim Richards driving a Porsche 911 RSCS.

Calendar
The championship was contested over an eight round series with two races per round.

Points system
Outright championship points were awarded on a 15-12-10-8-6-5-4-3-2-1 basis to the top ten outright finishers in each race with an additional point awarded to the driver gaining pole position for each race. Class points were awarded on the same 15-12-10-8-6-5-4-3-2-1 scale to the top ten finishers in each class in each race.

Standings

Class results

References

Australian GT Production Car Championship
GT Production Car Championship
Procar Australia